The Blood Sisters is a 2018 Philippine drama television series directed by Jojo Saguin, starring Erich Gonzales in three characters: Erika, Carrie and Agatha. The series premiered on ABS-CBN's Primetime Bida evening block and worldwide on The Filipino Channel on February 12, 2018, replacing Wildflower.

Dreamscape is the unit helming the production of The Blood Sisters. It was the initiative of Dreamscape Entertainment Head Deo Endrinal to deliberately create a show that is somewhat similar to the 1999 TV series, Saan Ka Man Naroroon. Where he served as one of the series' creative consultants. He suggested recreating Claudine's top-rating series but with a different touch. After numerous brainstorming sessions and careful deliberations, the creative team came up with The Blood Sisters concept about the triplets- Erika, Carrie and Agatha. The main difference between Saan Ka Man Naroroon and the series is that the story tackles the issue of surrogacy.

Series overview

Legend
 is the highest rating of the entire series. is the lowest rating of the entire series. is the highest rating of per season. is the lowest rating per season.

Episodes

Season 1 (2018)

Season 2   (2018)

Notes

References

Lists of Philippine drama television series episodes

Lists of soap opera episodes